The 1957 Men's World Weightlifting Championships were held in Tehran, Iran from November 8 to November 12, 1957. There were 76 men in action from 21 nations.

Medal summary

Medal table

References
Results (Sport 123)
Weightlifting World Championships Seniors Statistics

External links
International Weightlifting Federation

World Weightlifting Championships
World Weightlifting Championships
International weightlifting competitions hosted by Iran
World Weightlifting Championships